New Hampton is the name of several towns in the United States:

New Hampton, Iowa, county seat of Chickasaw County
New Hampton Township, Chickasaw County, Iowa
New Hampton, Missouri
New Hampton, New Hampshire, a New England town
New Hampton (CDP), New Hampshire, the main village in the town
New Hampton, New Jersey
New Hampton, New York